Daniel 'Dani' Romera Andújar (born 23 August 1995) is a Spanish footballer who plays as a forward for Real Murcia.

Club career

Almería
Born in Almería, Andalusia, Romera finished his youth career at UD Almería after starting out at UCD La Cañada Atlético. He made his senior debut with the B team in the 2011–12 season, in Segunda División B.

On 27 April 2013, Romera scored a hat-trick in a 5–2 home rout of La Roda CF. On 30 November he made his first-team – and La Liga – debut, playing the last 19 minutes of the 3–1 away loss against RC Celta de Vigo.

Romera made his second appearance with the main squad on 5 December 2014, in a 4–3 away win over Real Betis in the round of 32 in the Copa del Rey: after coming on as a substitute for Teerasil Dangda, he scored a goal which was later disallowed. He played his second league game on 17 January of the following year, as he featured four minutes in a 3–2 defeat at Valencia CF.

Barcelona B
On 21 September 2015, Romera signed a three-year deal with another reserve team, FC Barcelona Atlètic also of the third tier. On 1 April 2017, he scored a hat-trick in a 12–0 home demolition of CD Eldense.

Cádiz
On 17 July 2017, Romera agreed to a four-year contract at Cádiz CF from Segunda División, for a fee of €350,000. On 31 January 2019, having been rarely used during the campaign, he was loaned to CF Rayo Majadahonda of the same league for five months.

Romera moved to second division side AD Alcorcón on 15 August 2019, on a one-year loan.

Ponferradina
On 22 September 2020, Romera joined SD Ponferradina of the same league. Regularly used in his first season, he did not feature once in the league in the second, being loaned to Primera División RFEF club Gimnàstic de Tarragona on 28 December 2021.

Career statistics

References

External links

1995 births
Living people
Spanish footballers
Footballers from Almería
Association football forwards
La Liga players
Segunda División players
Segunda División B players
Primera Federación players
UD Almería B players
UD Almería players
FC Barcelona Atlètic players
Cádiz CF players
CF Rayo Majadahonda players
AD Alcorcón footballers
SD Ponferradina players
Gimnàstic de Tarragona footballers
CD Castellón footballers
Real Murcia players